Assonora is a village located in the Bardez taluka of Goa, India. The church of Assonora is St Clara's.

Education institution
The Educational Institution at Assonora, Goa St. Clare's High School, run by The Poor Sisters of Our Lady (PSOL), based at Infant Jesus of Prague Convent, Auchit Waddo, Assonora, Goa.

See also

 St Clara's Church (Assonora)

References

Villages in North Goa district